Volodymyr Dyudya (born 6 January 1983) is a Ukrainian former professional racing cyclist, who last rode for . He competes on both road and track. He was born in Bila Tserkva.

Major results

Track

2000
 1st  Individual pursuit, UCI World Junior Championships
2001
 2nd  Individual pursuit, UCI World Junior Championships
2002
European Championships
1st  Individual pursuit
1st  Team pursuit
World Cup Classics
3rd Individual pursuit, Monterrey
2003
European Championships
1st  Individual pursuit
1st  Team pursuit
World Cup Classics
1st Team pursuit, Cape Town
3rd Individual pursuit, Moscow
3rd Team pursuit, Moscow
2004
1st  Individual pursuit, European Championships
2004 World Cup Classics
2nd Individual pursuit, Moscow
2nd Individual pursuit, Sydney
2nd Team pursuit, Moscow
2004–05 World Cup Classics
1st Individual pursuit, Moscow
1st Team pursuit, Moscow
3rd Team pursuit, Los Angeles
2005
European Championships
1st  Individual pursuit
2nd Team pursuit
World Cup Classics
2nd Individual pursuit, Manchester
2006
3rd World Team Pursuit Championships
2007
World Cup Classics
1st Individual pursuit, Sydney
2nd Individual pursuit, Beijing

Road

2001
 1st Stage 2 
2006
 8th LuK Challenge
2007
 1st  Time trial, National Road Championships
 3rd Eindhoven Team Time Trial (TTT)
2011
 2nd Overall Tour de Ribas
1st Prologue
2014
 5th Race Horizon Park 1
 6th Race Horizon Park 2
 6th Race Horizon Park 3

External links

1983 births
Living people
Ukrainian male cyclists
Cyclists at the 2004 Summer Olympics
Cyclists at the 2008 Summer Olympics
Olympic cyclists of Ukraine
People from Bila Tserkva
Ukrainian track cyclists
National University of Ukraine on Physical Education and Sport alumni
Sportspeople from Kyiv Oblast